First North Luzon Transit, Incorporated (FNLT), or simply known as First North Luzon (former Royal Eagle) is a bus company in the Philippines. They started their operations in Hagonoy, Bulacan, and expanded to San Isidro, Nueva Ecija, Bulacan, Pampanga, Bataan, Pangasinan and La Union. and soon to operate in Laoag, Vigan and Cagayan (including Aparri, Tuguegarao and Piat.

History

First North Luzon Transit was founded in 2007 with a fleet of 100 buses.

Aside from being a public transport company, FNLT also offers shuttle services to individuals, corporations, and even to sponsor for major events. One example they did is when they sponsored free shuttle services from Metro Manila to the Philippine Arena during the #SaTamangPanahon concert of Eat Bulaga! last October 2015.

Their operations have since expanded to the provinces of Nueva Ecija, Pangasinan, La Union.

Royal Eagle, the former name of this bus company, it got its when the Five Star Bus Company took its management and started operating to Hagonoy, Bulacan and later expanded to San Isidro, Nueva Ecija, many places in Bulacan and Pampanga as well as Dagupan and San Carlos, Pangasinan, Bataan (Mariveles and Balanga) and San Fernando, La Union. The FNLT also has buses in Five Star and Bataan Transit hybrid livery.

Main Stops (for passengers)

For Nueva Ecija (San Isidro only) passengers their main stop is at Sto. Domingo in Mexico, Pampanga.

For Pangasinan passengers are allowed to disembark at the Dau Bus Terminal Mabalacat, Pampanga.

For the inter-provincial route Mariveles-San Fernando (La Union) the passengers also have the Bataan Transit bus terminal in San Fernando, Pampanga.

Fleet
First North Luzon Transit maintains and utilizes the following:
 Golden Dragon XML6103J12 
 Golden Dragon XML6127J6 
 Yutong ZK6100H 
 Higer KLQ6119QE3 
 Kia Granbird Parkway 
 Kia Granbird Bluesky
 King Long XMQ6119 
 Santarosa Cityliner Daewoo BF106 
 Santatosa Cityliner Daewoo BH117H
 Santarosa Nissan Diesel Exfoh (RB46S Chassis) 
 Hyundai Aerospace LD 
 Hyundai Aero City 
 Hyundai Universe Space Luxury 
 Hyundai Universe Space Luxury Premium 
 Hino RK 
 MAN R39 18.350 HOCL

Terminals 

These are their terminals as of 2018:

First North Luzon Transit under the management of Five Star and Bataan Transit, the First North Luzon Transit uses some terminals of Five Star and Bataan Transit, mainly Five Star's Cubao Terminal and  Bataan Transit's San Fernando terminal (La Union).

 Cubao - Five Star Bus Terminal, EDSA, Cubao, Quezon City
 P. Tuazon - EDSA corner P. Tuazon, Cubao, Quezon City
 Caloocan - LRT-Monumento, cor. 12th Ave. & Rizal Avenue Ext., Caloocan City
 Total Gas Station - Balintawak, EDSA-Balintawak, Quezon City
 Divisoria, Manila - Divisoria Street, corner Mayhaligue Street, Tondo, Manila (for Pampanga and Pangasinan trips only).

Provincial Hubs

Northern Luzon
Ilocos Norte
Laoag City - Gov. Lazaro Street corner Llanes Street, Laoag City
Ilocos Sur
Vigan City - Liberation Boulevard, corner Brgy., Barraca, Vigan City
La Union
San Fernando City - Brgy. Pagdaraoan, San Fernando City, La Union (Bataan Transit Bus Terminal)
Pangasinan
Dagupan City - Arellano St., Dagupan City
San Carlos City - Perez Blvd., San Carlos City, Pangasinan
San Manuel - Guiset Sur, San Manuel, Pangasinan
Urbiztondo - Brgy. Dalanguiring, Urbiztondo, Pangasinan
Cagayan
Tuguegarao City - 149 Pan Philippine National Highway, Tuguegarao City (via TPLEX)
Aparri - Del Pilar Street corner Macanaya Street, Aparri, Cagayan
Piat - Brgy., Poblacion I, Piat, Cagayan

Central Luzon
Bataan
Balanga City - Don Manuel Banzon Ave., Balanga City, Bataan
Mariveles - Lakandula St., Mariveles, Bataan (Bataan Transit Terminal)
Bulacan
 Hagonoy - Brgy. San Sebastian, Hagonoy, Bulacan
Pampanga
Candaba - Brgy., San Agustin Street corner Alcasid boulevard, Candaba, Pampanga
Macabebe - Brgy. Sta. Rita, Macabebe, Pampanga
Tarlac
Tarlac City - Siesta Bus Stop, Zamora St., Tarlac City, Tarlac
Nueva Ecija
San Isidro - Brgy. San Roque, San Isidro
Cabanatuan City - Brgy. Mabini Extension Cabanatuan City

Destinations

With the management of Five Star, First North Luzon Transit uses the terminal of Five Star, including main terminal in Cubao

Metro Manila
 Avenida, Manila 
 Divisoria, Manila (soon to operate for Bulacan,  Pampanga and Pangasinan trips only)
 Cubao, Quezon City 
 Monumento, Caloocan City

Provincial Destinations

Malolos City, Bulacan
Hagonoy, Bulacan
Paombong, Bulacan
Cabiao, Nueva Ecija
San Isidro
Cabanatuan City, Nueva Ecija
Arayat, Pampanga
Marquee Mall, Angeles City, Pampanga
Dau/Mabalacat Bus Terminal, Mabalacat City, Pampanga
Macabebe, Pampanga
Masantol, Pampanga
City of San Fernando, Pampanga
Balanga City, Bataan
Mariveles, Bataan
Orani, Bataan
Tarlac City
Balungao, Pangasinan 
Dagupan City, Pangasinan
San Carlos City, Pangasinan
San Manuel, Pangasinan
Urbiztondo, Pangasinan
Umingan, Pangasinan
San Fernando City, La Union
 Laoag City, Ilocos Norte (soon to operate)
 Vigan City, Ilocos Sur (soon to operate)
 Aparri, Cagayan (soon to operate)
 Tuguegarao City, Cagayan (soon to operate)
 Piat, Cagayan (soon to operate)

Note: Buses from Cubao to San Carlos/San Manuel Pangasinan will pass SCTEX Concepcion exit.

Inter-Provincial routes
 Dau Mabalacat City, Pampanga - Camiling, Tarlac via SCTEX Concepcion Exit
 Laoag City - Tuguegarao City (soon to operate)
 Vigan City - Tuguegarao City (soon to operate)
 City of San Fernando, La Union - Tuguegarao City (soon to operate)
 Dagupan City - Piat (soon to operate)
 Dagupan City - Tuguegarao  City (soon to operate)
 Dagupan City - Aparri (soon to operate)

Under Bataan Transit

Under the management of Bataan Transit, First North Luzon Transit uses the terminals of Bataan Transit in Mariveles and Balanga and Five Star's terminal in Cubao as main terminal.

Metro Manila
Cubao, Quezon City
Avenida, Manila

Provincial Destinations
San Fernando, Pampanga
Lubao, Pampanga
Balanga, Bataan
Orani, Bataan
Mariveles, Bataan
San Carlos, Pangasinan
Dagupan, Pangasinan
San Manuel, Pangasinan
San Isidro, Nueva Ecija
Candaba, Pampanga
Hagonoy, Bulacan
Macabebe, Pampanga
Guagua, Pampanga

Inter-Provincial routes
Mariveles - San Fernando (La Union) via San Fernando/Dau-Tarlac SCTEX, Concepcion Exit or TPLEX (Uses Bataan Transit)

Former Routes
First North Luzon Transit served Dagupan - Baguio via Agoo, La Union which is now Victory Liner.

Former Royal Eagle had also route to Roxas, Isabela which is now taken by Victory Liner, as well as Santiago, Isabela and Maddela, Quirino which are Five Star Bus Company's now.

Sister companies and subsidiaries
Although First North Luzon Transit is under its parent, Five Star Bus Company, the company has also its subsidiaries bearing with these names:
Bataan Transit
Victory Liner
Luzon Cisco Transport
CityBus Inc.
Laguna StarBus Transportation System, Inc
Maria de Leon Transportation

See also 
 List of bus companies of the Philippines

References

External links
 Facebook Business Page
 Official Website

Bus companies of the Philippines
Transportation in Luzon
Transportation in Quezon
Companies based in Quezon City